Abongile Nonkontwana (born 10 April 1995 in Port Elizabeth, South Africa) is a South African rugby union player for Ealing Trailfinders in the RFU Championship, having previously played for the  from 2018 to 2019. His regular position is lock, but he occasionally plays as a flanker or eighth man.

Career

Youth

He represented Border at primary school level, playing for their Under-13 side at the Craven Week competition in 2008. He also played for them in the 2011 Under-16 Grant Khomo Week.

In 2012, Nonkontwana moved to Pretoria to enroll at St. Alban's College. Here, he was selected in the 2012 South African Schools side, making one appearance for them against Wales in George.

After appearing for the Blue Bulls at the Under-18 Craven Week competition in 2013, he was again selected in that season's South African Schools side, playing in their match against France.

In 2014, he was included in the South Africa Under-20 squad for the 2014 IRB Junior World Championship. He started their opening match of the competition, a 61–5 victory over Scotland, and came on as a replacement in their 33–24 win over hosts New Zealand. He didn't feature in their final pool match against Samoa and was an unused replacement in the semi-final win over New Zealand. He also didn't feature in the final, where England won the competition by beating South Africa 21–20.

In the second half of 2014, he played for the  side in the 2014 Under-19 Provincial Championship, making eight appearances – mainly as a flanker – as his side made it all the way to the final against . Nonkontwana started the final, but could not prevent his side suffering a 26–33 defeat.

In 2015, he was again called up to a South Africa Under-20 training squad as preparation for the 2015 World Rugby Under 20 Championship. He started in their friendly match against a Varsity Cup Dream Team XV in April 2015 before being named in a squad to tour Argentina for a two-match warmup series. He played in both their 25–22 victory in the first match and their 39–28 victory in the second match against Argentina and was subsequently named in the final squad for the World Championship. He started their first match, a 33–5 win over hosts Italy, but did not feature in their remaining two pool matches or the semi-final defeat to England. He was named on the bench for their third-place play-off match against France, but failed to get any game time.

Blue Bulls

Nonkontwana was named in the  squad for the 2015 Vodacom Cup, but did not make any appearances in the competition.

In June 2015, he extended his contract at the Bulls until October 2017.

Ealing Trailfinders
On 7 September 2020, Nonkontwana travels to England to sign for Ealing Trailfinders in the RFU Championship from the 2020-21 season.

References

South African rugby union players
Living people
1995 births
Rugby union players from Port Elizabeth
Rugby union locks
Rugby union flankers
Blue Bulls players
South Africa Under-20 international rugby union players
Bulls (rugby union) players
Free State Cheetahs players
Cheetahs (rugby union) players
Ealing Trailfinders Rugby Club players
CS Bourgoin-Jallieu players